Abdul Karim Paz (born Santiago Ricardo Paz Zuberbühler Bullrich) is an Argentine Shi'i sheikh, head imam of the At-Tauhid ("the Oneness") mosque in the Floresta neighbourhood. He is known for holding pro-Iran views on AMIA bombing case. Paz serves also as a representative of Organización Islámica Argentina.

He holds close links with social leader Luis D'Elía and piquetero leader Fernando Esteche, as well as with Mohsen Rabbani, former cultural attaché at the Iranian embassy in Buenos Aires and accused in the AMIA trial.

Biography
Paz is descended from an aristocratic Argentine family. He was educated at the elitist Catholic school San Martín de Tours but later converted to Islam, at the age of 18, after becoming acquainted with Arab and Islamic cultures through a college professor, while pursuing philosophy studies at UBA. He then spent 5 years studying in Qom, Iran, studying Islamic jurisprudence and theology at the Al-Mustafa International University, returning to Buenos Aires in 1993 with the honorific title of Hujjat al-Islam and a master's degree in Islamic theology. He then briefly moved to Santiago Chile, where he set up an Islamic cultural centre. His wife, Masuma Assad Paz, is the head of the Argentine Muslim Women's League, the editor of Moazzen, and director of the activities of the Argentine Islamic Aid and Relief Committee and the Argentine Islamic Cultural Institute.

Paz is a cousin of Patricia Bullrich and close relative to Esteban Bullrich, both of them being Ministers of the Macri administration.

References

Year of birth missing (living people)
Living people
Argentine Muslims
Argentine religious leaders
Converts to Shia Islam from Catholicism